Leek High School is a mixed upper school (termed 'high school') located in Leek, Staffordshire, England. As of 2021, the number of students at the school is 373, including the sixth form, but capacity is 665.

Previously a foundation school administered by Staffordshire County Council, the school converted to academy status in April 2016, joining The Talentum Learning Trust. The school continues to coordinate with Staffordshire County Council for admissions. The school is colocated with The Meadows School, a mixed special school.

The school operates a joint sixth form with Westwood College, the Leek Federation Sixth Form, with a shuttle bus operating between the two sites.

History

Grammar school
Leek High School originally opened in 1900 as a co-educational secondary school located within the Nicholson Institute. It expanded throughout the twenty years following until 1921 when the girls were transferred to Westwood Hall. In 1939, the boys were transferred to a new building in Westwood Road.

Comprehensive
In 1965, the school was merged with the two secondary modern schools in Springfield Road, Mountside Boys' School and Milner Girls' School, to form a mixed comprehensive secondary school, with the Westwood Road building renamed as the Warrington Hall.

With the introduction of three-tier education in the late 1970s, the school moved all pupils to Springfield Road, extended the buildings with the addition of an eight laboratory science block and became a high school, with the Warrington hall becoming St Edwards Middle School.

The school achieved Specialist Technology College status in 2004.

Notable former pupils

Leek High School for Boys
 Air Chief Marshal Michael Knight, Commander from 1973-74 of RAF Laarbruch
 Frederick William Ratcliffe

References

External links

Leek High School website
Leek High School on Ofsted

Upper schools in Staffordshire
Leek, Staffordshire
Academies in Staffordshire